Forced Entry is an American thrash metal band, formed in 1983 in Seattle, Washington under the name Critical Condition. The band released two studio albums, one EP and three demos before breaking up in 1995, and briefly reunited in 2002. They announced in 2020 that they were planning to reunite again for a series of shows and possibly new material. Although Forced Entry never achieved mainstream success, they are often regarded as pioneers of the Seattle thrash metal scene, along with Metal Church, Panic, Bitter End, Coven, R.I.P. and Sanctuary (whom guitarist Brad Hull would join when they reunited in 2010, but left in 2015 after just one album).

History 
The band was formed in 1983 by vocalist/bassist Tony Benjamins, guitarist Brad Hull and drummer Colin Mattson under the name Critical Condition. It was a cover band that played songs from Kiss, Judas Priest, Iron Maiden and AC/DC. Critical Condition changed their name to Forced Entry in 1986, and the following year released two demos, All Fucked Up and Thrashing Helpless Down. The latter won them the 1987 Northwest Music Award for "Best Metal Band".

The band released a third demo, Hate Fills Your Eyes, in 1988, which led to the band's first record label contract. After turning down offers from major record companies, including CBS and MCA, they were signed to Combat Records (a subsidiary of Relativity), and in January 1989 recorded their debut album, Uncertain Future, which was released that June. The album received some favorable reviews, particularly from Guitar World magazine. Forced Entry embarked on two major tours in support of Uncertain Future; along with Atrophy, they opened for Coroner on their No More Color tour, and were one of the supporting acts (along with Obituary) on Sacred Reich's The American Way tour.

They began recording their second and final album, As Above, So Below, in December 1990 at Normandy Sound in Warren, Rhode Island. The album was released in June 1991. Although the album achieved neither the underground success nor the critical acclaim of Uncertain Future, it received some positive reviews, and the videos for "Macrocosm, Microcosm" and "Never a Know, But the No" were in heavy rotation on MTV's Headbangers Ball; the latter features cameos by the members of Alice in Chains. Forced Entry was soon dropped from Relativity, and as a result, the band did not tour in support of As Above, So Below.

The band continued to play shows and tried, unsuccessfully, to sign with another label. In 1995 they released a four-song EP, The Shore, and played a final show in Seattle in August. They reunited for one performance at the Abrasive Rock Festival in 2002.

Hull continued to be active in the music industry, joining local bands such as L.S. Diablo, Sac Lunch and Thug, and joined the reunited Sanctuary in 2011, appearing on their third album The Year the Sun Died (2014), but left in 2015. He also formed L.S. Diablo with guitarists Riley Hull and Aaron Goff and drummer Paul Marshall in 2009, playing bass on their self-produced six-song album. Benjamins and Mattson jammed in local band called DUMT, but both later retired from the music industry. In 1993 Hull and Benjamins appeared in an episode of "The Lame List", a recurring segment of the local Seattle television comedy Almost Live!.

Century Media reissued Uncertain Future in 1999 with The Shore as bonus tracks, while Lost and Found Records reissued As Above, So Below in 2009.

On November 27, 2020, Metal Storm reported that Forced Entry was planning to reunite for some shows in 2021. Coinciding with the reunion, the band's music became available for the first time on all streaming outlets. On February 15, 2021, Benjamins and Mattson confirmed in an interview with Misery Point Radio that they were planning on reforming Forced Entry for shows and possibly new material. They also revealed that there was talk of potentially replacing Hull (who was reportedly unavailable) with either Jeff Loomis, Russ Stefanovich of Bitter End, or Dean Babbitt of Coven.

Discography

Studio albums

EPs

Demos

References

External links 
 
 Forced Entry at Encyclopaedia Metallum
 Forced Entry at Metal Storm
 Forced Entry on Myspace

American thrash metal musical groups
Heavy metal musical groups from Washington (state)
Musical groups from Seattle
Musical groups established in 1983
1983 establishments in Washington (state)
Musical groups disestablished in 1995
Musical groups reestablished in 2002
Musical groups reestablished in 2020
1995 disestablishments in Washington (state)